The Carl Herget Mansion is a historic house located at 420 Washington Street in Pekin, Illinois. The house was built in 1912 for Carl Herget, a businessman and member of one of Pekin's most prominent families. Prominent Peoria architectural firm Hewitt & Emerson designed the Classical Revival house; the style was in vogue in the early twentieth century, mainly due to its use at the 1893 Columbian Exposition. The front entrance features a full-height porch topped by a pediment and supported by four Corinthian columns and two Corinthian pilasters. The entrance itself is flanked by Ionic pilasters and topped by a fanlight and dentillated segmental pediment. The south and east sides each feature porches with Doric columns and balustrades.

The house was listed on the National Register of Historic Places on August 18, 1992.

References

Houses on the National Register of Historic Places in Illinois
Neoclassical architecture in Illinois
Houses completed in 1912
Houses in Tazewell County, Illinois
National Register of Historic Places in Tazewell County, Illinois
1912 establishments in Illinois
Pekin, Illinois